Vico Ortiz (born October 10, 1991) is a Puerto Rican actor, drag king and activist. They are best known for their role as Jim in the HBO Max television series Our Flag Means Death.

Early life and education 
Vico Ortiz was born on October 10, 1991, in San Juan, Puerto Rico, where they were raised. Their mother tongue is Spanish, and they also speak English. 

Ortiz received their education at the American Academy of Dramatic Arts in Los Angeles.

Career 
Ortiz started their acting career in 2011 when they starred in the short film Oprah's Audience Moves On. For the following years, they had many small roles in others shorts and TV shows.

Around 2017–2018, Ortiz told their agent that they wanted to go for roles of all genders, whether non-binary (like them) or not. When they were hired for non-queer roles, they started suggesting to the writers that their characters could be non-binary, and some shows accepted to make the change.

In 2018, they starred in the queer web series Recon, about a group of teenagers attending a secret spy school, as Ren St. Claire, one of the main characters. Later that year they starred in two episodes of the TV show Vida.

In 2019, they starred in another queer web series titled These Thems, where they played Vero, a non-binary character befriending a 30 year old woman who just came out. Ortiz also wrote the Spanish subtitles for the show.

In 2021, they had recurring roles in both The Sex Lives of College Girls and S.O.Z. Soldados o Zombies.

In 2022, they had their first main role in a television show, Our Flag Means Death. Ortiz plays a non-binary pirate in this queer comedy about the romantic relationship between Blackbeard and Stede Bonnet which quickly became a hit. Ortiz says that their interactions with fans have changed their life, and that they felt allowed to get top surgery after seeing fan art of their character, Jim, getting gender-affirming surgery from the show's cook and de facto surgeon Roach (played by Samba Schutte).

Personal life 
Ortiz is non-binary and uses they/them pronouns in English and elle/le/e in Spanish. In an episode of the podcast Gender Reveal, they identified as genderfluid as well as non-binary, comparing their gender to a waterbed, "constantly moving, but in a fun way".

They are a drag king going by "Vico Suave". Their character takes inspiration from both their Hispanic/Caribbean and American culture, as well as "men who are comfortable with their femininity", such as Ricky Martin, Marc Anthony and Bad Bunny. They have another drag king persona named AJ when performing with their boy band the Backstreet Butches. Ortiz's drag king career started when a friend convinced them to participate in a show before they even knew what drag was.

Ortiz is an activist in subjects such as Puerto Rican federal voting rights, anti-racism and gender neutrality in the Spanish language.

Filmography

Television

Web series

References

External links
 

American non-binary actors
21st-century American actors
LGBT Hispanic and Latino American people
Puerto Rican LGBT actors
Puerto Rican non-binary people
Living people
1991 births
American Academy of Dramatic Arts alumni
Genderfluid people